Schuchin is a former airbase of the Belarusian Air Force located near Shchuchyn, Grodno Region, Belarus.

The base was home to the:
 10th Independent Reconnaissance Aviation Regiment between 1945 and 1993 with the Mikoyan-Gurevich MiG-25 (ASCC: Foxbat), Sukhoi Su-24 (ASCC: Fencer) and Mikoyan-Gurevich MiG-21 (ASCC: Fishbed)
 129th Fighter Aviation Division between 1945 and 1952.
 790th Fighter Aviation Regiment between 1945 and 1952 with the Lavochkin La-5, Lavochkin La-7 & Lavochkin La-9 (ASCC: Fritz).
 157th Bomber Aviation Division between 1954 and 1961
 993rd Bomber Aviation Regiment with Ilyushin Il-28 (ASCC: Beagle).
 998th Bomber Aviation Regiment with Il-28.
 979th Fighter Aviation Regiment between 1960 and 1989 with the Mikoyan-Gurevich MiG-23 (ASCC: Flogger).
 151st Independent Aviation Regiment for Electronic Warfare between 1989 and 1993 with the MiG-25.

References

Military installations of Belarus